Laurențiu Aurelian Reghecampf (born 19 September 1975) is a Romanian professional football manager and former player, who is currently in charge of Azerbaijan Premier League side Neftchi Baku.

Playing career

Club
Reghecampf was born in Târgoviște and began his career in his native city with Chindia. In the 1993–94 season, at the age of 18, Reghecampf was loaned to Austrian Bundesliga side SKN St. Pölten.

He later joined Steaua București where he won the league title twice. One year later, Reghecampf was loaned to Bulgarian side Litex Lovech, with whom he won the 1999 A PFG title.

In 2000, he was bought by German Bundesliga team Energie Cottbus. In 2004, he joined Alemannia Aachen, with whom he would become a fan favorite his side won promotion to the Bundesliga in his first season with the club. A few seasons later he was named captain of Alemannia. In the 2006–07 season of the German Cup, Reghecampf scored twice in a 4–2 victory over Bayern Munich, thus eliminating them from the competition.

On 4 July 2008, he joined second-tier side 1. FC Kaiserslautern on a free transfer for the 2008–09 2. Bundesliga season, only being able to play two matches because of a gastric virus infection, announcing his retirement in 2009 after his contract had not been extended.

International
Laurențiu Reghecampf made one appearance for Romania on 29 March 2003 when coach Anghel Iordănescu sent him on the field in the 62nd minute in order to replace Paul Codrea in a match which ended with a 5–2 home loss against Denmark at the Euro 2004 qualifiers.

Managerial career
Reghecampf started his managerial career with Liga II side Snagov in 2009. At the end of 2009–10 season, he was brought at Universitatea Craiova to save the team from relegation. He ended his quest successfully, but he was not kept at Craiova for the new season. Instead, Reghecampf joined Gloria Bistrița. He was sacked after only 12 games because of poor results. Reghecampf returned to Snagov, but after only five games he was called back to Craiova, to help the team avoid relegation. He was sacked after only six games, following a conflict with several players.

He started the 2011–12 season at FC Snagov, for a second spell. In December 2011, he signed a contract with Romanian Liga I club Concordia Chiajna, with the main objective to avoid relegation, after a half-season the club was above the relegation zone 17th overall when he took over. He changed almost the entire squad, bringing 17 new players, most of them from Snagov, and after a series of wins, his side finished the season in ninth place.

This evolution brought the attention of his former team, Steaua București, and at the end of the season, they offered him a contract for a season. His objective was to bringt the first championship title for FCSB after a seven-year absence. In March 2013, he guided FCSB to the last 16 of the Europa League after eliminating Ajax from the competition. The first leg away finished with a 2–0 win to Ajax in Amsterdam. In the second leg home, FCSB took a 2–0 lead and the 2–2 aggregate pushed the game into extra-time. FCSB beat the Dutch side 4–2 on penalties. FCSB were eliminated by eventual winners Chelsea after winning 1–0 in the first leg at home and losing 1–3 away at Stamford Bridge. 
In May 2013 he mathematically won the Romanian League and later the Romanian Supercup. On 9 May 2014, FCSB and Reghecampf won their second consecutive league title. He helped FCSB to qualify for the UEFA Champions League group stages. Reghecampf also lead his side to the Romanian Cup final which FCSB lost 4–2 on penalties to league runners-up Astra Giurgiu.

On 27 May 2014, he signed a two-year contract with Saudi Arabian side Al-Hilal. He led Al-Hilal to the AFC Champions League final five months after his appointment, by defeating Al-Ain 4–2 on aggregate in semi-finals. However, his side lost the final to Western Sydney Wanderers on a two-leg match. He was sacked on 15 February 2015 after another final loss, in the Saudi Crown Prince Cup.

In August 2015, he was appointed manager of Bulgarian side Litex Lovech. In December 2015, Reghecampf announced his decision to leave the club to join Steaua București for the second time. In May 2017, he stepped down as manager.

On 3 July 2017, Reghecampf was announced as the new head coach of the Emirati club Al Wahda on a 2-year deal replacing Javier Aguirre. According to sources, his salary will be $2.6 million per season plus potential bonuses up to another $1.6 million. On 16 September 2017, in his Arabian Gulf League debut, Al-Wahda defeated Dibba Al-Fujairah 5–0.

In January 2019, Reghecampf took over as manager of relegation-threatened UAE Pro League club Al-Wasl. Eventually, he heeded them from relegation after a strong run.

On 1 April 2021, Reghecampf was announced as the new manager of Saudi Professional League club Al Ahli. Less than two months later, after two wins, two draws and a loss, he was dismissed.

On 26 July 2021, Reghecampf returned to his native Romania, where he signed a two-year contract to become the new manager of CS Universitatea Craiova. After finishing the previous season third in the league table, the team saw themselves in sixth position in December 2021, triggering rumours of his premature departure from the club. As a result, Reghecampf transfer-listed several first-team players, including Mihai Bălașa, Matteo Fedele, Antoni Ivanov and Mihai Roman. In June 2022, he stepped down as coach.

On 21 June 2022, Neftchi Baku announced the appointment of Reghecampf on a two-year contract.

Managerial statistics

Football academy 
In July 2015, he opened the Reghecampf Soccer Academy, which is a school for kids that want to learn how to play soccer. The academy is based in the United States and located in Henderson, Nevada.

Honours

Player
Oțelul Târgoviște
Divizia B: 1995–96
Divizia C: 1994–95

Steaua București
Divizia A: 1996–97, 1997–98
Cupa României: 1996–97
Supercupa României: 1998

Litex Lovech
A PFG: 1998–99

Manager
Steaua București
Liga I: 2012–13, 2013–14
Supercupa României: 2013
Cupa Ligii: 2015–16

Al Hilal
AFC Champions League runner-up: 2014
Saudi Crown Prince Cup runner-up: 2014–15

Al Wahda
UAE League Cup: 2017–18
UAE Super Cup: 2017, 2018
UAE Pro-League runner-up: 2017–18

Individual
Gazeta Sporturilor Romania Coach of the Year: 2013

References

External links

 SteauaFC profile  
 
 
 
 Reghecampf Soccer Academy

1975 births
Living people
Sportspeople from Târgoviște
Association football midfielders
Romanian footballers
Romanian expatriate footballers
Romania international footballers
Romania under-21 international footballers
Romanian football managers
FCM Târgoviște players
FC Steaua București players
PFC Litex Lovech players
FC Energie Cottbus players
Alemannia Aachen players
1. FC Kaiserslautern players
SKN St. Pölten players
Liga I players
Liga II players
Austrian Football Bundesliga players
First Professional Football League (Bulgaria) players
Bundesliga players
2. Bundesliga players
Romanian expatriate sportspeople in Austria
Romanian expatriate sportspeople in Bulgaria
Romanian expatriate sportspeople in Germany
Expatriate footballers in Austria
Expatriate footballers in Bulgaria
Expatriate footballers in Germany
Romanian expatriate football managers
FC Steaua București managers
Al Hilal SFC managers
PFC Litex Lovech managers
Al Wahda FC managers
Al-Wasl F.C. managers
Al-Ahli Saudi FC managers
Liga I managers
Saudi Professional League managers
Expatriate football managers in Saudi Arabia
Expatriate football managers in the United Arab Emirates
UAE Pro League managers
Azerbaijan Premier League managers
ACF Gloria Bistrița managers
CS Concordia Chiajna managers
CS Universitatea Craiova managers
Neftçi PFK managers
Expatriate football managers in Bulgaria
Expatriate football managers in Azerbaijan
Romanian expatriate sportspeople in Saudi Arabia
Romanian expatriate sportspeople in the United Arab Emirates